Shaoguan Danxia Airport , or Shaoguan Air Base, formerly named Shaoguan Guitou Airport, is a dual-use military and civil airport in Shaoguan, Guangdong Province, China.  It is located in the town of Guitou in Ruyuan Yao Autonomous County, 18 km southeast of Lechang Township, 25 km northwest of the city center.  The air base was built in 1970 and briefly served commercial flights from 1986 to 1989. Shaoguan was planning to expand the airport in early 2008.

Due to the Wuguang High-Speed Railway put into service since late 2009, Shaoguan Railway Station has become a major and the most convenient transportation hub connecting Pearl River Delta cities. Also, Lechang Township has promised a 100 million CNY investment for Lechang East Railway Station. Construction for the airport expansion project began in October 2017, and it opened on November 27, 2021.

Airlines and destinations

See also
List of airports in China
List of the busiest airports in China
List of People's Liberation Army Air Force airbases
List of airports in Guangdong province, from 1911-current (Zh-Wiki)

References

Airports in Guangdong
Chinese Air Force bases
Buildings and structures in Shaoguan
Airports established in 1970
1970 establishments in China